The 2010 Bahia gubernatorial election was held on October 3 as part of the general elections in Brazil. In this election, Bahian citizens eligible to vote decided incumbent Governor Jaques Wagner, of the center-left Workers' Party, should receive a new four-year term. His main challengers were former Governor Paulo Souto, of the right wing Democrats, and Minister for National Integration Geddel Vieira Lima, of centrist Brazilian Democratic Movement Party.

Opinion polling
Scenario 2010

First scenario

Second scenario

Third scenario

Fourth scenario

References

2010 Brazilian gubernatorial elections
Bahia
October 2010 events in South America
2010